The Waimea Ditch is an irrigation canal on the island of Kauai, Hawaii.

In 1903, the Waimea Ditch was dug to divert water from the Waimea River to nearby sugar cane fields.  Construction of Waimea Ditch was completed in 1907.

During 1911–1912, George Ewart, the manager of the Waimea Sugar Company, reconfigured the Waimea Ditch by replacing the iron flumes with tunnels to increase its flow capacity.

See also
H.P. Faye
Kikiaola
Kokee Ditch

External links 
 Volunteers Clean One Big Island Ditch – News story from khnl.com
 Damage to Big Isle ditches still unknown – News story from starbulletin.com
 

Canals in Hawaii
Geography of Kauai
Irrigation in the United States
Canals opened in 1907